The 26th Busan International Film Festival opened on October 6 at the Busan Cinema Center in Busan, South Korea with South Korean film Heaven: To the Land of Happiness by Im Sang-soo. Park So-dam and Song Joong-ki hosted the opening of the festival, which was streamed live on YouTube.

In 26th edition, 223 films from 70 countries were officially invited to the festival. 63 community service screenings were also part of the festival. In addition, this year BIFF  opened two special programs, ‘New Voices, Chinese Films’ dedicated to emerging, talented Chinese directors, and the best Asian films by female directors, ‘Wonder Women Movies’, to highlight the contribution of female directors to the world of cinema. This edition of festival has constituted a new award 'Watcha Award' to be awarded to two selected films screened in the 'New Currents' section and the 'Korean Cinema Today-Vision' section. 22 short films official invited to the 'Wide Angle' competition section were screened online on YouTube and Naver.

'Vision Night' awards ceremony was held on October 14 in which winners of 'Korean Cinema Today - Vision Section' were announced. On October 15 in an online press conference the winners of 'New Currents' and other awards were announced and it was informed that 76,072 people visited the film festival in ten days. The festival closed on October 15 with closing ceremony hosted by Lee Joon-hyuk and Lee Joo-young and screening of film Anita by Longman Leung. South Korean film The Apartment with Two Women by Kim Se-in won five awards, including New Currents award.

Jury

New Currents (competition section)
 Deepa Mehta, Indian-Canadian, international master director, screenwriter, Head Juror
 Christina Nord, section head of the Berlinale Forum 
 Jeong Jae-eun, South Korean film director

Kim Jiseok Award
Reza Mirkarimi, Iranian film writer and director. (Jury Chairman)
 Gulnara Abikiyeva, Kazakhstan film critic and professor
 Kim Haery, Member of the editorial board of the film magazine Cine21 and film critic

BIFF Mecenat Award
 Nanfu Wang, Chinese-born American filmmaker
 Park Kyung-geun, director
 Mandy Marahimin, Indonesian film producer

Sonje Award
 Bastian Mayraison, France, Asian film consultant at various film festivals around the world. (Executive Chairman, Terres d’Ici, Terres d’ailleurs)
 Royston Tan, Singaporean filmmaker, director, screenwriter, producer and actor.
 Danbi Yoon, South Korean filmmaker

Actor and Actress of the Year
 Uhm Jung-hwa, South Korean singer, actress and dancer
 Cho Jin-woong, South Korean actor

FIPRESCI Award
 Nada Azhari Gillon, France Film Critic
 Wang Hsin, Taiwan Film Critic
 Kim Nemo, Korea Film Critic

NETPAC Award
 Freddy Olsson, Sweden Senior Programmer, Göteborg Film Festival
 Mevlut Akkaya, Turkey/US Director
 Yoo Sun-Hee, Korea Chairperson, Beautiful Hapcheon Independent Film Festival (BHIFF)

DGK MEGABOX Award
 Kim Jae-han, Korea Director  
 Jang Cheol-soo, Korea Director

KBS Independent Film Award
 Kim Mu-ryeong, Korea Producer
 Darcy Paquet, US Film Critic, Translator
 Lee Jong-pil, Korea Director

CGK Award
 Kim Byeong-jeong, Korea Cinematographer
 Back Yoon-seuk, Korea Cinematographer
 Lee Seon-yeong, Korea Cinematographer

Critic b Award
 Gim Jiye-on, Korea Film Critic
 Park In-ho, Korea Film Critic
 Hong Eun-mi, Korea Film Critic

Program sections
Sources:

The festival has following sections:
 Gala Presentation
 Icons
 New Currents
 A Window on Asian Cinema
 Korean Cinema Today Panorama
 Korean Cinema Today Vision Section
 World Cinema
 Flash Forward
 Wide Angle
 Open Cinema
 Special Program in Focus
 New Voices, Chinese Films
 Wonder Women Movies

Opening and closing films

Gala Presentation
Source:

Icons

New Currents
Main competition section at BIFF, showcases the works by emerging Asian directors.
Highlighted title indicates award winner

A Window on Asian Cinema
Seven films were selected to compete for the Kim Jiseok award:

Out of competition
These films were screened 'out of competition' as part of A Window on Asian Cinema:

Korean Cinema Today - Panorama Section
Sources:

Korean Cinema Today - Vision Section
In 2021 it was expanded to 12 selections and showcased as world premiere.
Highlighted title indicates award winner

World Cinema
Source:

Flash Forward
From this edition, this section has the films that have already won awards or become hot topic at other film festivals.
Highlighted title indicates award winner

Wide Angle

Korean Short Film Competition

Asian Short Film Competition

Nominees for Mecenat Award
Documentary Competition
10 nominations, consisting of 5 Korean and 5 Asian feature-length documentaries were announced.

Documentary Showcase
(Busan Cinephile Award Nominees)
Highlighted title indicates award winner

Out of competition

Open Cinema

On Screen

Special program in focus

Wonder Women Movies
10 best Asian films by female directors selected on the basis of responses from 117 film professionals in a span of one year:

New Voices, Chinese Films

Awards and winners
Awards
The following awards will be presented at the 26th edition:

The Asian Filmmaker of the Year
Korean Cinema Award
New Currents Award
Kim Jiseok Award
BIFF Mecenat Award
Sonje Award
Actor & Actress of the Year Award
Actor of the Year: 
Actress of the Year: 
 KB New Currents Audience Award
Flash Forward Audience Award
FIPRESCI Award
NETPAC Award
DGK MEGABOX Award
CGV Arthouse Award
KBS Independent Film Award
CGK Award (Cinematographers Guild of Korea)
Critic b Award
Watcha Award from 2021
 Citizen Critics' Award
Busan Cinephile Award

Winners

See also 
 List of film festivals in South Korea
 Busan
 Haeundae-gu, Busan

References

External links 
 

Busan International Film Festival
Busan International Film Festival
2021 in South Korea
Busan International Film Festival